Margaret Mills is a former Zimbabwean international lawn bowler.

Bowls career
Mills started bowling in 1964 and won double Bronze at the 1981 World Outdoor Bowls Championship in Toronto in the triples event and team event (Taylor Trophy). The following year she won a historic gold medal for Zimbabwe at the Commonwealth Games because it was the first time that Zimbabwe as a nation competed in the Games.

She played in the team that won the gold medal in the triples event with Anna Bates and Flo Kennedy at the 1982 Commonwealth Games.

Mills went on to compete for Zimbabwe in the fours at both the 1990 and 1994 Commonwealth Games.

References

Zimbabwean female bowls players
Living people
Bowls players at the 1982 Commonwealth Games
Bowls players at the 1990 Commonwealth Games
Bowls players at the 1994 Commonwealth Games
Commonwealth Games medallists in lawn bowls
Commonwealth Games gold medallists for Zimbabwe
Year of birth missing (living people)
Medallists at the 1982 Commonwealth Games